African Airways Alliance  is a Somali-owned airline holding headquartered in Mogadishu.

Overview
African Airways Alliance was established on 19 February 2015, when Daallo Airlines merged with Jubba Airways. The new firm is equally owned by both airlines' founders. At this time, both airlines together offered 13 destinations including Dubai, Jeddah and Nairobi with plans to greatly expand their networks and fleet in the upcoming years. As of 2021, both airlines continue to operate under their separate brands.

References

External links

Airlines of Djibouti
Airlines of Somalia
Airlines established in 2015
Daallo Airlines
Jubba Airways
2015 establishments in Somalia